The Mubarizun ("duelists", or "champions") formed a special unit of the Rashidun army during the Muslim conquests of the 7th century. The Mubarizun  were a recognized part of the Muslim army with the purpose of engaging enemy champions in single combat.
In Arab, Byzantine, and Sassanian warfare, battles usually began with duels between the champion warriors of the opposing armies.

The Muslim army would typically begin battle with its soldiers first equipping their armor, assembling their units to their positions and lastly dispatching the Mubarizun. Mubarizun fighters were instructed to refrain from pursuing any defeated enemy champions more than two-thirds of the way to the enemy lines to avoid the risk of being cut off. After the conclusion of the dueling phase, the army would launch its general advance.

List of notable Mubarizun
Ali ibn Abi Talib
Khalid ibn al-Walid
Dhiraar bin Al-Azwar
Al-Qa'qa'a ibn Amr at-Tamimi
Asim ibn 'Amr al-Tamimi
Abd al-Rahman ibn Abu Bakr (Son of Caliph Abu Bakr)
Al-Bara' ibn Malik.
Zubayr ibn al-Awwam

See also
Mard o mard
Muslim conquest of Syria

References

Bibliography

People from the Rashidun Caliphate
Military history of the Rashidun Caliphate
Dueling